José Antonio Canales Rivera (born 28 March 1974 in Barbate, Cádiz, Andalusia, Spain) is a well-known Spanish bullfighter.

He belongs to an important family of bullfighters. His mother, Teresa Rivera Pérez, was the sister of Francisco Rivera Pérez “Paquirri” and José Rivera Pérez, “Riverita”. His cousins are also well-known bullfighters, Francisco Rivera Ordóñez and Cayetano Rivera Ordóñez.

On 29 October 2004, he married María del Carmen Fernández Deudero in Cádiz and they have two children, José Antonio "Pancho" (30 May 2005-) and Carmela Guadalupe (1 May 2007-).

References
 Portal Taurino article

1974 births
Living people
Spanish bullfighters